Suhadole is a settlement in the Municipality of Komenda in the Upper Carniola region of Slovenia.

Church

The local church is dedicated to Saint Clement. It was extensively renovated in 1999 and remnants of an earlier church, found during the renovation, are now displayed in the church.

Notable people
Notable people that were born or lived in Suhadole include the following:
 France Pibernik (1928–2021), poet, author, essayist, and literary historian

References

External links

Suhadole on Geopedia

Populated places in the Municipality of Komenda